Tamerlan Abdulganiyevich Musayev (born 29 July 2001) is a Russian football player. He plays for FC Baltika Kaliningrad.

Club career
He made his debut in the Russian Football National League for FC Baltika Kaliningrad on 2 August 2020 in a game against PFC Krylia Sovetov Samara, he substituted Maksim Kuzmin in the 90th minute.

References

External links
 
 Profile by Russian Football National League
 

2001 births
Sportspeople from Dagestan
21st-century Russian people
Russian Muslims
Living people
Russian footballers
Association football forwards
FC Anzhi Makhachkala players
FC Arsenal Tula players
FC Baltika Kaliningrad players
FC Volga Ulyanovsk players
FC KAMAZ Naberezhnye Chelny players
Russian First League players
Russian Second League players